Haven Entertainment, founded in 2006 as Tom Sawyer Entertainment is a film production and management company founded by Rachel Miller and Jesse Hara. Haven produced happythankyoumoreplease, the US Audience Award winner at the 2010 Sundance Film Festival. Miller is an agent who represented Josephine Angelini's Starcrossed.

Following the 2008 writers strike, Tom Sawyer shifted and began to develop books before adapting them to the big screen.  In 2012, Tom Sawyer merged with Picture Machine and the new company is known as Haven Entertainment.

Films
 Happythankyoumoreplease, 2010
 Liberal Arts, 2012

References

External links

Film production companies of the United States